Idioteuthis tyroi is a species of whip-lash squid. It is known from a single paralarva of 15 mm mantle length (ML). The paralarva is unique in having expanded tentacular clubs, although few mastigoteuthids have described paralarvae.

References
Salcedo-Vargas, M.A. 1997. Cephalopods from the Netherlands Indian Ocean Programme (NIOP) - II. Mastigoteuthid lineage and related forms. Beaufortia 47: 91-108.

External links

Tree of Life web project: Idioteuthis tyroi

Whip-lash squid